Prince Amara (born 15 March 1973) is a Sierra Leonean sprinter. He competed in the men's 4 × 400 metres relay at the 1996 Summer Olympics.

References

External links

1973 births
Living people
Athletes (track and field) at the 1992 Summer Olympics
Athletes (track and field) at the 1996 Summer Olympics
Sierra Leonean male sprinters
Sierra Leonean male middle-distance runners
Olympic athletes of Sierra Leone
Place of birth missing (living people)